The INAS 344 is an Indian naval air squadron based at INS Parundu, Tamil Nadu.

References 

Aircraft squadrons of the Indian Navy
Naval units and formations of India